Andrea Thomas (born 12 September 1968) is a Canadian gymnast. She competed in six events at the 1984 Summer Olympics.

References

1968 births
Living people
Canadian female artistic gymnasts
Olympic gymnasts of Canada
Gymnasts at the 1984 Summer Olympics
Sportspeople from Mississauga